The A.J. Fisher House is a historic house in Walland, Tennessee, U.S.. It was built circa 1902 for the Schlosser Leather Company. It was designed in the Colonial Revival and Queen Anne architectural styles. From 1902 to 1922, the first manager of the Schlosser Leather Company, A.J. Fisher, lived in the house. It has been listed on the National Register of Historic Places since July 25, 1989.

References

Houses on the National Register of Historic Places in Tennessee
Queen Anne architecture in Tennessee
Colonial Revival architecture in Tennessee
Buildings and structures in Blount County, Tennessee